Sue Mi Terry (born ) is a former CIA officer, researcher, and senior fellow at the Center for Strategic and International Studies. A former intelligence analyst specializing in East Asia, Terry is regularly quoted in print and web media as an expert on international politics involving North Korea, South Korea and Japan.

In 2021, she became director of the Hyundai Motor-Korea Foundation Center for Korean History and Public Policy at the Wilson Center, succeeding Jean H. Lee.

Early life and education 
Terry was born in Seoul. After her father's death due to liver cancer when she was in the fourth grade, she moved with her mother to the United States at age 12.  She was raised in Hawaii and Virginia.

Terry received her B.A. in political science from New York University in 1993. In 2001, she earned her  Ph.D. in international relations from the Fletcher School of Law and Diplomacy at Tufts University.

Career 
She worked at the Central Intelligence Agency, the National Security Council, the National Intelligence Council and the Weatherhead East Asian Institute at Columbia University. From 2001 to 2008, Terry was a senior analyst on Korean issues for the CIA, where she produced hundreds of intelligence assessments. From 2008 to 2009, Terry was director of Korea, Japan and oceanic affairs in the National Security Council under Presidents George W. Bush and Barack Obama. In this capacity, she formulated, coordinated, and implemented U.S. government policy toward Korea and Japan as well as Australia, New Zealand, and Oceania. She was a National Intelligence Fellow in the David Rockefeller Studies Program of the Council on Foreign Relations in New York from 2010 to 2011. Since leaving the government, Terry served as a Senior Research Fellow at Columbia University's Weatherhead East Asian Institute from 2011 to 2015 and as Senior Advisor for Korea at Bower Group Asia from 2015 to 2017. Terry has received numerous awards for her leadership and mission support, including the 2008 CIA Foreign Language Award.

In 2017 she became a senior fellow for the Korea Chair at the Center for Strategic and International Studies.

Terry has been cited as an expert on topics involving North Korea, such as the likelihood of North Korean defections during and after the Olympics, whether US election results will affect relations with North Korea, the probabilities for success of summit meetings between state leaders in the US and North Korea, the impact of postponing or canceling joint military exercises, the effects of United Nations actions regarding human rights in North Korea and whether North Korea will attack South Korea.

References

External links

1970s births
Living people
New York University alumni
The Fletcher School at Tufts University alumni
People from Seoul
Analysts of the Central Intelligence Agency
United States National Security Council staffers